Adriaen van Cronenburg (also Cronenburgh, Cronenburch) (Schagen,  – Bergum, after 1604) was a Northern Netherlandish painter. He produced mainly portraits.

Cronenburg was active between about 1547 and 1590, working in the provinces of Friesland and Groningen. He also spent some time in Belgium, especially in Leuven and Antwerp, where he painted the portrait of Katheryn of Berain now in National Museum Cardiff.

Cronenburg's cousin married into two aristocratic families in succession, and it is likely through this connection that he became secretary of Tietjerksteradeel in 1567. Following the Union of Utrecht, Cronenburg left Friesland in 1580 due to his refusal to give up Catholicism. He was allowed to return to Friesland in 1592 and settled in Bergum.  The last signed works known are from 1587 and 1590. 

The identity of Adriaen van Cronenburg was established by A. Wassenbergh, formerly the director of the Fries Museum, based on his unusual signature, A.a.a.a. van Cronenburg. 

Anna van Cronenburg (1552 – ) was a documented relation of Adriaen, the daughter of a doctor whose second husband became mayor of Leeuwarden in 1579. The issue of the real identity of the artist was raised in an article in 1934 by G. Marlier.  
 
Various works by Cronenburg are in the Fries Museum, and a group of four related portraits of women is in the Prado Museum in Spain.  The Prado group are all three-quarter length standing portraits of ladies, two with daughters of perhaps ten years old. One has a skull on a table, like the Cardiff portrait. The four, plus a lost fifth work, were inventoried in the Spanish royal collection at the old royal palace, the Royal Alcazar of Madrid, in 1636, and show their subjects in front of the same background of a Renaissance blind arcade with niches and green drapery, and are virtually the same size (about 1.05 x 0.79 cm).

References

Further reading
G. Marlier, "Un portraitiste frison du XVIe siècle. Anna ou Adriaen van Cronenburch", Oud-Holland 51 (1934) 1–10.
P. Bakker, Gezicht op Leeuwarden. Schilders in Friesland en de markt voor schilderijen in de Gouden Eeuw, Amsterdam, 2008, p. 191

External links
 Paintings by Adriaen van Cronenburg in the Fries Museum
 

Adriaen van Cronenburg in the RKD
Adriaen van Cronenburg on artnet

Dutch Renaissance painters
1520s births
1600s deaths
People from Friesland
People from Schagen